The Raymond Dewas Trophy was awarded to the most sportsmanlike player in the Ligue Magnus from 1985 to 1998.

Winners

External links
 Fédération Française de Hockey sur Glace

Ligue Magnus
Ice hockey trophies and awards
French ice hockey trophies and awards
Sportsmanship trophies and awards